The women's pole vault at the 2018 European Athletics Championships took place at the Olympic Stadium on 7 and 9 August.

Records

Schedule

Results

Qualification
Qualification: 4.55 m (Q) or best 12 performances (q)

Final

References

Pole vault W
Pole vault at the European Athletics Championships
Euro